Walter Woolf King (November 2, 1899 – October 24, 1984) was an American film, television and stage actor and singer.

Born in San Francisco, California in 1899, King started singing for a living at a young age and performed mostly in churches. He made his Broadway debut in 1919, and became a well-known baritone in operettas and musical comedies. King billed himself as Walter Woolf and Walter King early in his career, eventually settling on a combination of all three names in the mid-1930s.

In 1936, King was host of the Flying Red Horse Tavern on CBS radio.

King began his film career in musicals but quickly moved into supporting roles. He is probably best remembered today for his villainous roles in two films starring the Marx Brothers: A Night at the Opera (1935) and Go West (1940). He also appeared with Laurel & Hardy in Swiss Miss (1938). King made several appearances on radio and later became an actors agent. During the 1950s and 1960s, he was seen in several often uncredited bit parts and smaller roles in television and films. In the first episode of The Munsters he is credited for his role as George Washington. His final appearance was in the 1977 TV movie One in a Million: The Ron LeFlore Story.

King died in Beverly Hills, California in 1984.

Filmography

References

External links

 
 

1899 births
1984 deaths
20th-century American male actors
20th-century American singers
American male film actors
American male stage actors
American male television actors
Male actors from San Francisco
Singers from San Francisco
American baritones
20th-century American male singers